Splendid Fellows is a 1934 Australian film from director Beaumont Smith about an Englishman (Frank Leighton) who comes to Australia. The cast includes Eric Colman, brother of Ronald Colman, and Sir Charles Kingsford Smith, who has a cameo as himself. It was Smith's last film.

Plot
"Silly ass" Englishman Hubert Montmorency "Monty" Ralston goes to Australia after an argument with his father, accompanied by his valet, Thomson. In a Sydney two up parlour he befriends Australian farmer Jim McBride and goes with him to McBride's farm where he meets flying parson, Reverend Arthur Stanhope. He also falls for McBride's daughter, Eileen.

Monty persuades his father to buy a plane for the parson and enters it in the Centenary Air Race from London to Melbourne. While the race is in progress, Stanhope's old plane crashes and Monty flies to the rescue. A blind prospector, Blind Teddy, flying with the parson regains his sight and recognises a long-lost goldfield.

Cast
Frank Leighton as The Hon. Hubert Montmorency Ralston
 Leo Franklyn as Thompson
 Frank Bradley as Jim McBride
 Eric Colman as Reverend Arthur Stanhope
 Isabelle Mahon as Eileen McBride
 Peggy Ross as Mrs McBride
 Bill Stewart as Teddy Lawson)
 Andrew Higginson as Lord Ralston
 Madge Aubrey as Mrs Brogan
 Charles Zoli as Signor Spigoni
 Sir Charles Kingsford Smith as himself

Production
The film was shot at the studios of Cinesound Productions in Rushcutter's Bay, Sydney in July and August 1934. It was originally entitled The Big Race but was retitled after an American film of that name was announced.

Footage of the real Centenary Air Race was incorporated, as was that of the landing of C. W. A. Scott and Tom Campbell Black at Laverton, and the arrival of the Duke of Gloucester to Melbourne. This meant the movie was not actually completed until October.

Raymond Longford was an assistant director.

Isabelle Mahon was a 17-year-old actor who had appeared on stage in The Gay Divorcee.

Reception
When the film was in post-production, Smith announced plans to make another feature, in New Zealand, "a modern drama with a sporting theme and glimpses of Māori life." However, Splendid Fellows was a commercial disappointment on release and led to Smith's permanent retirement from film production. Reviews were mixed.

References

External links
Splendid Fellows in the Internet Movie Database
Splendid Fellows at Australian Screen Online
Splendid Fellows at National Film and Sound Archive
Splendid Fellows at Oz Movies

1934 films
Films directed by Beaumont Smith
Films directed by Raymond Longford
Australian adventure drama films
1930s adventure drama films
Australian black-and-white films
1934 drama films